Gossip Girl is a teen drama which premiered on September 19, 2007, in the United States on The CW. Gossip Girl is based on the young-adult book series of the same name written by Cecily von Ziegesar, and was developed for television by The O.C. creators Josh Schwartz and Stephanie Savage. The series follows the lives of the young, wealthy, and social elite residing in the Upper East Side of Manhattan, and is narrated by an unseen and seemingly omniscient character, "Gossip Girl", whose blog is widely read among the characters.

A total of 121 episodes of Gossip Girl were aired over six seasons, between September 19, 2007, and December 17, 2012.

Series overview

Episodes

Season 1 (2007–08)

Season 2 (2008–09)

Season 3 (2009–10)

Season 4 (2010–11)

Season 5 (2011–12)

Season 6 (2012)

Specials 
One special episode, not part of the official continuity, was produced to complement the first season and was broadcast on The CW on January 28, 2008. A retrospective of the entire series aired on December 17, 2012, before the series finale.

Ratings

Webisodes

Chasing Dorota 
The CW aired six mini webisodes centering on Dorota, the Waldorf's housekeeper.

References

External links

Episodes
 
Lists of American teen drama television series episodes